Kentucky Route 186 (KY 186) is a  state highway in the U.S. state of Kentucky. The highway connects mostly rural areas of Bell County with Middlesboro.

Route description
KY 186 begins at the Tennessee state line southwest of Middlesboro, within Bell County, where the roadway continues as Fork Ridge Road. It travels to the northeast, paralleling Bennetts Fork, and curves to the east-northeast to enter Middlesboro. It crosses over some railroad tracks and Yellow Creek. The highway has an intersection with the southern terminus of KY 3502 (Winchester Avenue). At this intersection, KY 74 Truck begins traveling concurrently with KY 186. The two highways travel north-northwest for two blocks. They both end at an intersection with KY 74 (West Cumberland Avenue). At this intersection, the roadway continues as KY 1599 (Airport Road).

Major intersections

See also

References

0186
Transportation in Bell County, Kentucky